The Conference of Drama Schools (CDS) was the organisation which represented the top 21 accredited UK drama schools in the United Kingdom from 1969 until 2012.

History
Originally founded in 1969 as an educational charitable organization it changed to company status on the 29 June 2000, originally the 22 member schools offered courses in Acting, Musical Theatre, Directing and Technical Theatre training. On 31 July 2012, it merged with the National Council for Drama Training to form Drama UK.

Members
 Academy of Live and Recorded Arts (ALRA)
 The Arts Educational Schools (ArtsEd)
 Bristol Old Vic Theatre School
 Cygnet Training Theatre
 Drama Centre London
 Drama Studio London
 East 15 Acting School (E15)
 Guildford School of Acting (GSA)
 Guildhall School of Music and Drama
 Italia Conti Academy of Theatre Arts
 London Academy of Music and Dramatic Art (LAMDA)
 The Manchester Metropolitan School of Theatre (The Manchester School of Theatre // ManMet)
 Mountview Academy of Theatre Arts
 The Oxford School of Drama
 Queen Margaret University
 Royal Academy of Dramatic Art (RADA)
 Rose Bruford College
 Royal Central School of Speech and Drama (RCSSD)
 Royal Conservatoire of Scotland (formerly RSAMD)
 Royal Welsh College of Music & Drama (RWCMD)

References

Sources
 Richardson, Jean (1998). Careers in the Theatre. Kogan Page Publishers. 
 The Conference of Drama Schools

External links
Website

Art and design-related professional associations
Drama schools in the United Kingdom
Educational institutions established in 1969
Higher education organisations based in the United Kingdom
Theatre in the United Kingdom
1969 establishments in the United Kingdom